I Just Came Home to Count the Memories is the third studio album by American country music artist John Anderson. It was released in October 1981 under Warner Bros. Records. Three singles were released from this album, which were "Would You Catch A Falling Star", "I Danced With The San Antone Rose", and the title track. The middle failed to chart.

Track listing

Personnel
Acoustic Guitar: Bobby Thompson, Pete Wade
Background Vocals: Donna Kay Anderson, Ronnie Drake, Beckie Foster, Joy Gardner, Allen Henson
Banjo: Bobby Thompson
Bass guitar: Henry Strzelecki
Drums: Jerry Carrigan, Buddy Harman, Kenny Malone
Electric Guitar: Fred Carter Jr.
Fiddle: Buddy Spicher
Lead Vocals: John Anderson
Piano: Hargus "Pig" Robbins, Bobby Wood
Steel Guitar: Pete Drake, Buddy Emmons
Strings: The Sheldon Kurland Strings
Tic-Tac Bass: Harold Bradley
Upright Bass: Bob Moore

Chart performance

References

John Anderson (musician) albums
1981 albums
Warner Records albums